Gaston Glock (born 19 July 1929) is an Austrian engineer and businessman who is the founder of the company Glock, who are best known for developing the Glock pistol in 1981.

Manufacturing
Glock began as a manufacturer of curtain rods in the 1960s, and knives for the Austrian military in the 1970s, and did not design or manufacture a firearm until he was 52 years old. He already had experience with polymers as a result of his previous business ventures. In 1980, he bought an injection-moulding machine to manufacture handles and sheaths for the field knives he was making for the Austrian army in his garage workshop. His earliest employees were from the camera industry and experienced in producing polymer components. His first pistol took one year to produce from the design and concept stage to production, and he applied for an Austrian patent in April 1981 for the pistol known as the Glock 17.

Personal life
Glock married Helga Glock in 1958, and they co-founded the family business in 1963. They divorced in 2011 and went into litigation over accusations that Glock engaged in racketeering. The lawsuit was dismissed in 2017. Glock supports different charities in Austria, having donated over one million euros. He also was quoted for giving funds to the Freedom Party of Austria.

Murder attempt
In July 1999, Glock suspected that Charles Ewert, one of his closest financial advisers, had been embezzling funds. Glock confronted Ewert, who had hired a French mercenary (aged 67) to murder Glock with a rubber mallet in a car park, in an attempt to make it look like an accident. Glock was hit in the head but able to fight back, punching the man until he collapsed on top of Glock. Both Ewert and the assassin were convicted of attempted murder and sent to prison.

References 

Firearm designers
People from Gänserndorf District
1929 births
Living people